CD-53 was a C Type class escort ship (Kaibōkan) of the Imperial Japanese Navy during the Second World War.

History
CD-53 was laid down by Nippon Kokan K.K. at their Tsurumi shipyard on 15 August 1944, launched on 29 October 1944, and completed and commissioned on 28 November 1944. On 28 November 1944, she was assigned to the 1st Escort Fleet, Kure Guard Force, Kure Naval District with Haruo Yamagata (山縣春雄) as her commanding officer. On 5 February 1945, she was assigned to the Hainan Guard Office under the administration of the Imperial Japanese Army. During the war CD-53 was mostly busy on escort duties.

On 29 January 1945, she departed Moji-ku, Kitakyūshū for Singapore in convoy HI-93 serving as an escort along with CD-61, CD-63, and CD-207 for transport Kiyokawa Maru and oilers Toa Maru and Toho Marun. On 1 February 1945, the convoy reached Hainan Island; on 3 February 1945, the convoy reached Qui Sande Bay; and on 6 February 1945, the convoy reached Vân Phong Bay just north of Cam Ranh Bay.

CD-53 was struck from the Navy List on 10 March 1945.

References

Additional sources

1944 ships
Ships built in Japan
Type C escort ships
Maritime incidents in February 1945
Ships sunk by American submarines